Nice Work is a British television adaptation of the Booker prize-shortlisted 1988 novel of the same name by David Lodge.  It was broadcast in 1989 on BBC2 and starred Warren Clarke and Haydn Gwynne.

Characters
The series considered of the following cast:

 Robyn Penrose, played by Haydn Gwynne
 Vic Wilcox, played by Warren Clarke
 Marjorie Wilcox, played by Janet Dale
 Brian Everthorpe, played by John Forgeham
 Stuart Baxter, played by David Calder
 Philip Swallow, played by Christopher Godwin
 Rupert Sutcliffe, played by Terry Coates

Production

The screenplay was directed by Christopher Menaul.  

The first TV episode was broadcast on BBC2 on 4 October 1989. Subsequent episodes were broadcast on 11 October,  18 October, and 25 October.

A DVD edition, on 2 Region 2 discs, was released by the BBC on 24 Nov 2014.

Reception

The programme won the 1989 Royal Television Society award for best drama series.

References

External links

1989 British television series debuts
1989 British television series endings
1980s British drama television series
BBC television dramas
BBC Birmingham productions
Television shows based on British novels
1980s British television miniseries
English-language television shows
Television shows set in the West Midlands (county)